Charmaine White Face, or Zumila Wobaga, is an Oglala Tetuwan (Lakota language speaker) from the Oceti Sakowin (Great Sioux Nation) in North America.

She is known for her work in support of Native American rights, in particular as coordinator of the Defenders of the Black Hills, a volunteer environmental organization centered on efforts to encourage the United States government to honor the Fort Laramie Treaties of 1851 and 1868.

She also works at the international level in support of recognition of human rights of indigenous peoples all over the world. 
She is the spokesperson for the Sioux Nation Treaty Council established in 1894. 
She was a participant in the prayer fast/hunger strike held in December 2004 in Geneva, Switzerland at the final meeting of the Intersessional Working Group on the Draft Declaration on the Rights of Indigenous Peoples (WGDD). She has worked to preserve Bear Butte, on monitoring of abandoned uranium mines, on "environmental remediation of hazardous waste ponds," and in the anti-nuclear power movement. In Jan. 2013, she raised concerns about radiation exposure of South Dakota Army National Guard soldiers in the Buffalo Gap National Grassland.

Charmaine White Face is also a columnist and freelance writer who has written for Indian Country Today, the Rapid City Journal, the Sioux Falls Argus Leader, and The Lakota Journal, and is a grandmother.

See also 

 Black Hills
 Janet McCloud
Uranium in the environment
Anti-nuclear movement in the United States
The Navajo People and Uranium Mining
Uranium mining debate
Thomas Banyacya

References

External links 
 Defenders of the Black Hills
 "Livestock Grazing in the Black Hills" - video of interview with Charmaine White Face
 Sacred Land, Poisoned Peoples; the Pre-Congress report at the 19th Annual IPPNW Conference, Basel Switzerland

American human rights activists
Women human rights activists
Native American activists
Oglala people
Black Hills
People from the Pine Ridge Indian Reservation, South Dakota
Living people
Year of birth missing (living people)
Anti-uranium activists
Uranium mining
21st-century American women
21st-century Native American women
21st-century Native Americans